Ruellia helianthemum is a plant native to the Cerrado vegetation of Brazil.

helianthemum
Flora of Brazil